Brajići is a village in the municipality of Gornji Milanovac, Serbia. According to the 2002 census, the village has a population of 67 people. At the early stage of the World War II in Yugoslavia, on 27 October 1941, the village was a site of the meeting between Yugoslav Partisans leader Josip Broz Tito and Četnik leader Draža Mihajlović.

References

Populated places in Moravica District